Glen Ruth is a rural locality in the Tablelands Region, Queensland, Australia.

Geography
The Herbert River forms most of the western boundary.

References 

Tablelands Region
Localities in Queensland